Ostrołęka may refer to the following places:
Ostrołęka, Pajęczno County in Łódź Voivodeship (central Poland)
Ostrołęka, Zgierz County in Łódź Voivodeship (central Poland)
Ostrołęka in Masovian Voivodeship (east-central Poland)
Ostrołęka, Świętokrzyskie Voivodeship (south-central Poland)
Ostrołęka, Grójec County in Masovian Voivodeship (east-central Poland)
Ostrołęka, Radom County in Masovian Voivodeship (east-central Poland)